The Lamar Soccer Complex, built in 2009 on the campus of Lamar University, is a soccer facility located in Beaumont, Texas.  It is the home stadium for the Division I (NCAA) Lamar Lady Cardinals soccer team.  The stadium has a permanent seating capacity of 500.  Stadium features include covered benches for both the home and visiting teams, lighting, and a programmable fertilization and irrigation system.  Construction of the stadium began on June 15, 2009.  Construction cost of the soccer field and adjacent Lamar Soccer and Softball Complex building was $3,724,920.  The stadium and supporting Lamar Soccer and Softball Complex building were part of a $29 million athletic construction project.

The first match at the new stadium was a 2-1 loss against the New Mexico State Aggies on September 25, 2009.  Official attendance for the opening game was 513.

Post Season play
The stadium served as the site of the 2014 and 2018 Southland Conference soccer tournaments.

Yearly attendance 

Below is the Lady Cardinals' yearly home attendance at the Lamar Soccer Complex.

* Stadium capacity limited to 75 due to COVID19 precautions
The attendance record of 702 was set vs Incarnate Word on September 30, 2022.

Lamar Soccer and Softball Complex building

The Lamar Soccer and Softball Complex building is located in between the soccer stadium and the Lamar Softball Complex.  The building, over 11,000 square feet in size, serves both softball and soccer.  It includes coaches offices, academic study areas, laundry facilities, equipment storage, home and visitor locker rooms, concessions, public restrooms, and a training facility, one of four training facilities on campus.

See also

List of soccer stadiums in the United States

References

External links
Lamar Soccer Complex

College soccer venues in the United States
Soccer venues in Texas
Sports venues in Beaumont, Texas
Lamar Cardinals and Lady Cardinals sports venues
Sports venues completed in 2009
2009 establishments in Texas
Lamar Lady Cardinals soccer